"Nervous Shakedown" is the fourth song on the AC/DC album Flick of the Switch, released in 1983. It was written by Angus Young, Malcolm Young and Brian Johnson. It charted in the UK at No. 35, staying on the charts for five weeks. It also reached No. 20 in Ireland.

"Nervous Shakedown" was released as a maxi-single or EP in 1984. The songs included on this release are: A1. "Nervous Shakedown"; A2. "Rock And Roll Ain't Noise Pollution" (live Detroit '83); B1. "Sin City" (live Detroit '83); B2. "This House Is on Fire" (live Detroit '83).

Two videos were made for the track. The first video was filmed on the same set and in the same format as the videos for "Flick of the Switch" and "Guns For Hire". However, another version was filmed which features the group on stage at the Joe Louis Arena in Detroit, MI, during a before-show rehearsal.

Personnel
Brian Johnson – lead vocals
Angus Young – lead guitar
Malcolm Young – rhythm guitar, backing vocals
Cliff Williams – bass guitar, backing vocals
Phil Rudd – drums

Charts

References

AC/DC songs
1983 songs
Songs written by Angus Young
Songs written by Brian Johnson
Songs written by Malcolm Young